Tamié Abbey (Abbaye de Tamié or Abbaye Notre-Dame-de-Tamié) is a Cistercian monastery, located in the Bauges mountain range in the Savoie region of France. It was founded in 1132, as a daughter house of Bonnevaux Abbey, by Peter of Tarentaise, who was also the first abbot.
It continues as a Trappist community of 30 monks, famous for its cheese, Abbaye de Tamié.

Sources and external links
 Tamié Abbey website 

Cistercian monasteries in France
Trappist monasteries in France
Religious organizations established in the 1130s
1132 establishments in Europe
1130s establishments in France
Buildings and structures in Savoie
Christian monasteries established in the 12th century